Adriana Barré (born 4 April 1995) is an Ecuadorian professional footballer. She was part of the Ecuadorian squad for the 2015 FIFA Women's World Cup.

References

External links
 
 Profile  at FEF
 

1995 births
Living people
Ecuadorian women's footballers
People from Santo Domingo de los Colorados
Women's association football midfielders
Ecuador women's international footballers
2015 FIFA Women's World Cup players
Pan American Games competitors for Ecuador
Footballers at the 2015 Pan American Games
Ecuadorian women's futsal players
21st-century Ecuadorian women